The following is a list of notable massacres in Bolivia.

Bolivia
Massacres

Human rights abuses in Bolivia
Massacres